Andrews Street Bridge is a historic stone arch bridge located at Rochester in Monroe County, New York. It was designed by city engineer J. Y. McClintock, constructed in 1893, and spans the Genesee River.  It has seven segmental arches with spans of 36 feet and rises of nine feet.

It was listed on the National Register of Historic Places in 1984.

References

External links

Bridges in Rochester, New York
Road bridges on the National Register of Historic Places in New York (state)
Bridges completed in 1893
National Register of Historic Places in Rochester, New York
Stone arch bridges in the United States